Amukta is a small yet mountainous island in the Islands of Four Mountains group lying between the Fox Islands and the Andreanof Islands in the Aleutian Islands. The nearest islands to it are Yunaska and Seguam Island; it is separated from Seguam Island by Amukta Pass. The small island of Chagulak lies directly northeast of it.

Islands of Four Mountains
Islands of Unorganized Borough, Alaska
Islands of Alaska